The 69109/69110 Vadodara–Surat MEMU is a MEMU train of the Indian Railways connecting  and . It is currently being operated with 69109/69110 train numbers on a daily basis.

Service

69109/Surat–Vadodara MEMU has average speed of 37 km/hr and covers 130 km in 3 hrs 30 min.
69110/Vadodara–Surat MEMU has average speed of 40 km/hr and covers 130 km in 3 hrs 15 min.

Route 

Coach composition

The train consists of 20 MEMU rake coaches.

External links 

 69109/Surat-Vadodara MEMU
 69110/Vadodara-Surat MEMU

References 

Transport in Vadodara
Transport in Surat
Electric multiple units in Gujarat